Manmasi National Christian Army (MNCA) is a Christian extremist group operating in North East India. In 2009, this group with about 15 members, were charged with forcing Hindus to convert at gunpoint. Seven or more Hmar youths were charged with visiting Bhuvan hill, a Hindu village, armed with guns, and pressuring residents to convert to Christianity. They also desecrated temples by painting crosses on the walls with their blood. The Sonai police, along with the 5th Assam Rifles, arrested 13 members of the MNCA, including their commander-in-chief. Guns and ammunition were seized.

References

Christian terrorism in Asia